LRFC may refer to:

Lancaster RFC
Letterkenny Rovers F.C.
Linlithgow Rose F.C.
Liverpool Ramblers F.C.
Lydney Rugby Football Club